The  was a type of short-sleeved Japanese garment, and the direct predecessor of the kimono. Though its component parts directly parallel those of the kimono, its proportions differed, typically having a wider body, a longer collar and narrower sleeves.

History

Following dress edicts designed to decrease the number of layered garments worn at court, the  gradually became outerwear from roughly the Kamakura period onwards. Styles of wearing the such as layering two  and wearing the uppermost robe stripped off from the shouldersbecame popular, alongside a number of newly-developed textile decoration techniques, such as dyeing and embroidery, used to decorate the garment.

Initially undyed, the dyed  came in the Muromachi period, peaked in popularity in the Momoyama period, and faded out in the Keicho period and Edo period.

The 's proportionsa wide body and comparatively narrow sleevesgradually evened out over time, before coming to resemble those of a modern kimono around the Edo period.

Components

 the overlapping front panels. The , due to the length and low placement of the collar, had a far more triangular appearance than the irregular quadrilateral  on modern kimono; this gave the  a sloping, low-waisted appearance.

Gallery

See also
 List of items traditionally worn in Japan

References

Bibliography
 Gluckman, Dale Carolyn, and Sharon Sadako Takeda, eds. When Art Became Fashion: Kosode in Edo-Period Japan. New York: Weatherhill, 1992.
 Kennedy, Alan. Japanese Costume: History and Tradition. New York: Rizzoli, 1990.
 Kosode: 16th–19th Century Textiles from the Nomura Collection. New York: Kodansha International, 1985.

External links
 Momoyama, Japanese Art in the Age of Grandeur, an exhibition catalog from The Metropolitan Museum of Art (fully available online as PDF), which contains material on 
 Tokyo National Museum – an example of period clothing, including .
 The Tale of Genji Costume Museum – includes period clothing, including 
  Made Simple
 Kyoto National Museum

Japanese full-body garments
Folk costumes
Japanese words and phrases